Japanese Holocaust can refer to:

 Atomic bombings of Hiroshima and Nagasaki
 Japan and the Holocaust
 Japanese war crimes